Q52 may refer to:
 Q52 (New York City bus)
 At-Tur, a surah of the Quran